Ellis Dwight Rainsberger Sr. (October 20, 1932 – July 17, 2021) was an American gridiron football player, coach, and scout. He served as the head football coach at Washburn University (1962–1964), Southern Illinois University Carbondale (1966), and Kansas State University (1975–1977), compiling a career college football record of 27–42–1. Rainsberger was the head coach of the USFL's Pittsburgh Maulers for part of the 1984 season, tallying a mark of 1–7. He was most recently a scout with the Tennessee Titans (2000–2004) and Miami Dolphins (2005–2007) of the National Football League (NFL).

Playing career
Rainsberger was a three-year football letterman at Kansas State University in the 1950s, as well as a two-time All-Big Eight Conference selection. He was also a letterman for the Kansas State wrestling team.

Coaching career
Rainsberger served as the head football coach at NAIA-level Washburn University from 1962 to 1964, posting a record of 17–10 and winning a conference championship in 1964. His record at Washburn ranks him ninth in terms of total wins and tenth in terms of winning percentage. He became the 11th head football coach at Southern Illinois University Carbondale for one season in 1966, tallying a record of 4–5–1. Rainsberger returned to his alma mater to serve as head football coach at Kansas State from 1975 to 1977. He started his tenure there while, winning his first three games, but ultimately compiled a record of 6–27. Rainsberger left Kansas State with the program placed on probation for giving too many scholarships.

Following his termination at Kansas State, Rainsberger served as offensive coordinator for the Winnipeg Blue Bombers of the Canadian Football League (CFL) from 1978 to 1982. He spent the 1983 season as an assistant coach with the Denver Gold of the United States Football League (USFL). In 1984, he was interim head coach of the Pittsburgh Maulers for the second half of the season. The head coach he replaced, Joe Pendry, had been Rainsberger's offensive coordinator at Kansas State. During his long career, Rainsberger has also held a number of assistant coaching positions in the college ranks. He worked as an assistant coach at the Drake University (1959–1961), the University of Kansas (1965), the University of Illinois (1967–1972), the University of Wisconsin–Madison (1973–1974), and the University of Toledo (1989–1991).

Head coaching record

References

1932 births
2021 deaths
American football offensive linemen
American players of Canadian football
Drake Bulldogs football coaches
Illinois Fighting Illini football coaches
Kansas Jayhawks football coaches
Kansas State Wildcats football coaches
Kansas State Wildcats football players
Kansas State Wildcats wrestlers
Miami Dolphins scouts
Southern Illinois Salukis football coaches
Saskatchewan Roughriders players
Tennessee Titans scouts
Toledo Rockets football coaches
Toronto Argonauts coaches
United States Football League coaches
Washburn Ichabods football coaches
Winnipeg Blue Bombers coaches
Wisconsin Badgers football coaches
Players of American football from St. Louis